Rapid City Muscle Car is the second studio album by American band the Cherry Poppin' Daddies, released in 1994 on Space Age Bachelor Pad Records.

Overview
Rapid City Muscle Car was structured around the Daddies' desire to create a stylistic concept album in which each track was composed as the total musical opposite of the last - "[whipping] the listener around as if he/she was...experiencing stylistic G-forces" - but remaining thematically coherent through interconnected lyricism following an abstract narrative. 

Delving into wider-reaching and more experimental territory than their punk rock roots, the result is arguably the Daddies' most musically eclectic work. Building upon the band's then-standard repertoire of swing and funk, Rapid City Muscle Car weaves between ska punk, rockabilly, country, psychedelia, big band and lounge. The album also makes extensive use of outside instruments, adding acoustic guitars, accordions, clarinets and vibraphones in addition to the band's keyboards and horn section. A full big band orchestra is used on "Come Back to Me", a cover song taken from the 1965 Burton Lane/Alan Jay Lerner Broadway musical On a Clear Day You Can See Forever.

"Come Back to Me" was later re-recorded for the Daddies' 2014 Rat Pack tribute album Please Return the Evening, featuring only the band's regular line-up as opposed to a full orchestra.

Track listing
All songs composed by Steve Perry, except where otherwise noted.

Previous availability
The same recording of "The Ding-Dong Daddy of the D-Car Line" (then titled "Ding Dong Daddy") was first released on a 1992 7" entitled The Daddies.

Personnel
 Cherry Poppin' Daddies
Steve Perry – vocals
Dang Oulette (Dan Schmid) – bass
Dana Heitman – trumpet, trombone
Chris Azorr – keyboards
Brian West – drums, vibes, percussion
Adrian Baxter – tenor saxophone, bass clarinet
Jason Moss – lead guitar

 Additional musicians
Brooks Brown – alto saxophone, clarinet
John Fohl – guitar on track 4
James Phillips – tenor saxophone on track 4

 The First Church of Sinatra
Featured on track 14:
Tim Allums – trumpet
Mark Berney – trumpet
Dave Van Handel – trombone
Glenn Bonney – trombone
Wayne Conkey – bass trombone
Ross Warren – alto saxophone
Tim Willcox – alto saxophone
James Phillips – tenor saxophone
Richard Coon (Temple) – baritone saxophone

Production
Tracks 1 - 2, 4, 6 - 7, & 9 engineered and mixed by Bill Barnett at Gung Ho Studio in Eugene, Oregon
Tracks 5, 8, 10, 12 - 15 engineered by Dana Heitman at Space Age Bachelor Pad Studio, mixed by Bill Barnett
Track 3 recorded at Space Age Bachelor Pad Studio by Bob Levy
Track 11 recorded at Dogfish by Drew Canulette

References 

Cherry Poppin' Daddies albums
1994 albums
Concept albums